Jääsjärvi is a medium-sized lake of Finland. It is located in the Hartola and Joutsa municipalities, in the Central Finland and Päijänne Tavastia regions. The water quality in the lake is excellent. The river Tainionvirta has its source in Jääsjärvi and flows through several smaller lakes to Päijänne. The water in Jääsjärvi is bright. The lake is part of the Sysmä catchment area and Kymijoki main catchment area.

There are dozens of islands in the lake. The biggest are Vehkasalo, Hirtesalo, Kotisalo, Ohrasaari, Urrionsaari, and Nautsalo. Vehkasalo, Hirtesalo, and Ohrasaari have roads connecting them to the mainland.

In winter time, the lake typically freezes.

References

See also
List of lakes in Finland

Lakes of Joutsa
Lakes of Hartola